was a samurai during the Edo period of Japan. Iori was an adopted son of legendary ronin Miyamoto Musashi.

Early life
Iori was the adopted son of Miyamoto Musashi. He was adopted at the age of 11 by the master swordsman in 1623, when his adoptive father was 39 and living in Edo. The genealogy of Iori's grandon states that Iori was Musashi's nephew from his eldest brother.

Career
Iori was a vassal of Ogasawara Tadazane, a Japanese samurai daimyō of the early Edo period. Iori's rise under Ogasawara's service was exceptionally fast. Iori entered at age 15 as a page and soon after became an official vassal. By 1632 Iori received 2500 koku and became one of Ogasawara's principal vassals. By 1638 his salary was increased by 1500 koku because of his efforts during the siege of Shimabara. At only 26 he had become Ogasawara's highest ranked vassal.

References

Further reading
 
福田正秀著『宮本武蔵研究論文集』歴研　2003年　
福田正秀『宮本武蔵研究第2集・武州傳来記』ブイツーソリューション　2005年　 

1612 births
1678 deaths
Japanese swordfighters
Miyamoto Musashi